{{Speciesbox
|image =Salvia multicaulis.jpg 
| image_caption = Salvia multicaulis growing in its natural habitat in Tannourine cedar reserve, Lebanon
|taxon = Salvia multicaulis
|authority = Vahl|synonyms = S. acetabulosa}}Salvia multicaulis'' is a low-growing perennial shrub native to Turkey and bordering countries.

Small violet flowers grow in whorls of 4–10 with conspicuous reddish-brown bracts. It has been reported that the plant has significant antioxidant and antimicrobial activity.

Notes

External links
 

multicaulis
Flora of Lebanon
Flora of Turkey
Taxa named by Martin Vahl